Maykop is the capital city of the Republic of Adygea, Russia.

Maykop or Maikop may also refer to:

Maykop culture, prehistoric culture of the northern Caucasus, ca. 3500 BCE–2500 BCE
Maikop kurgan, the eponym for the Maykop culture
Maykop Airport, a civilian airport in the Republic of Adygea, Russia

See also
Maykopsky (disambiguation)